The 1941–42 Hong Kong First Division League season was the 34th since its establishment. The season was never finished due to the Battle of Hong Kong.

References
RSSSF

Hong Kong First Division League seasons
Hong
football
football
Events cancelled due to World War II